The Workshops Rail Museum is a railway museum in Ipswich, Queensland, located within the former North Ipswich Railway Workshops.

The museum
Opening in September 2002 as part of the Queensland Museum Network, The Workshops Rail Museum tells the story of more than 150 years of rail in Queensland.

The museum experience is made up of 15 interactive exhibitions with locomotives and beautifully restored carriages on display, children's interactive indoor playground, train simulators and model railway.

The museum is housed in the original Boilershop, part of the historic North Ipswich Railway Workshops site.

Museum highlights:

 A10 – The A10 is the oldest working locomotive in Australia built in 1865.
 Deconstructed Diesel Locomotive – A cut away displaying everything from bogies to batteries and axles to auxiliary generators of a diesel locomotive.
 Train Simulator – Step inside a diesel locomotive cab and drive a train in the diesel simulator.
 Vice Regal Carriage – The special carriage built at the Ipswich Railway Workshops in 1903 for the governor of Queensland and visiting royalty.
 Model Railway – The largest model railway depicting Queensland.
 Nippers Railway – A children's indoor adventure playground of a miniature railway with dress up and interactive activities.

Collection
The museum's collection contains items from Queensland Rail as well as various private operators.

The site
The 60-acre site is the birthplace of rail in Queensland and at its peak had more than 3000 people working there.

The Ipswich Railway Workshops is the only Australian rail yard still in operation from the 1800s. In its early days The Workshops was a centre for rail construction and maintenance, and by 1950 had built more than 200 steam locomotives, establishing its own sawmill and powerhouse to provide raw materials and energy.

Visitor to the site can see the heritage powerhouse, timekeepers building and worker's canteen, and The Workshops’ boiler shop where the museum is housed.

The Workshops 

The Workshops, as it is affectionately known, is a massive complex with a proud history.

For decades the site was the centre of rail construction, maintenance and technology, producing more than 200 steam locomotives for Queensland's burgeoning rail industry.

Thousands of workers have called The Workshops their home over the years. The Ipswich Railway Workshops and the people who worked here played an essential role in keeping the railways of Queensland running.

Here generations of blacksmiths, carpenters, painters, metalworkers and other craftsmen built and repaired locomotives, wagons, carriages and railmotors.

During the Second World War, The Workshops employed up to 3,000 men and women, mostly from Ipswich and the surrounding areas, making it one of the state's largest employers of the time.

The Workshops is the only Australian railway workshop that has been in continuous operation since the 1800s.

The Powerhouse 
The Powerhouse building dominates The Workshops site and is an Ipswich icon.

The Powerhouse was one of the first buildings completed at the new Workshops. It was built in 1901-02 by contractor D. D. Carrick.

The electrical equipment was provided through Noyes Brothers of Sydney by Westinghouse Electric and Manufacturing Co. The 2-phase 60 cycle system provided power for about 200 electric motors on site.

The Powerhouse supplied electricity to The Workshops at least 15 years before electricity came to Ipswich itself. It also provided compressed air and hydraulic pressure systems to the site.

The boilers were located on the east side of the building. The engine room, on the west side, contained the generators and switching gear.

The electricity was used to drive individual machine tools in the workshops and even provided power for the overhead travelling cranes which could lift up to 27 tonnes.

Electricity was also provided to Ipswich Railway Station and the shunting yard on the south side of the Bremer River.

When Ipswich finally gained its own powerhouse and had electricity reticulated throughout Ipswich, technology had progressed and the old system was obsolete. The Powerhouse generators were then changed to convert the Ipswich power to suit the requirements of The Workshops.

Locomotives 
The first locomotives in Queensland were imported from England in a knock-down format and on arrival they were erected on-site.

As early as 1877, locomotives were being built at The Workshops.

In total more than 200 locomotives and 13,000 carriages were produced at The Workshops.

On display is A10 No. 6. This steam locomotive was built in Glasgow, Scotland in 1865. In 1896 it was sold to a private company and used to haul sugar cane near Bundaberg. The A10 is part of the Queensland Rail Heritage Fleet and is sometimes used for public steam train trips.

At first, steam engines moved mainly goods, but were soon used to carry passengers as well. Steam engines are still in use all over the world, although most have been replaced by diesel or electric trains.

Open hours 
The Workshops Rail Museum is open daily 9:30am to 4pm (except ANZAC Day, Christmas Day and Boxing Day). In addition, the museum holds special events including the annual Day out with Thomas event, school holiday programs, touring exhibitions and events.

The museum is available for venue hire and has an onsite shop and café

The Workshops Rail Museum is part of the Queensland Museum Network.

See also
 List of transport museums
 List of museums in Queensland

References

External links
 https://theworkshops.qm.qld.gov.au/

Ipswich, Queensland
Railway museums in Queensland
2002 establishments in Australia